Crag may refer to:

 Crag (climbing), a cliff or group of cliffs, in any location, which is or may be suitable for climbing
 Crag (dice game), a dice game played with three dice
 Crag, Arizona, US
 Crag, West Virginia, US
 Crag and tail, a geological formation caused by the passage of a glacier over an area of hard rock
 Crag Group, a geological group outcropping in East Anglia, UK
 Coralline Crag Formation
 Norwich Crag Formation
 Red Crag Formation
 Wroxham Crag Formation, see Cromer Forest Bed
 Crag Hotel, Penang, Malaysia
 Crag Jones (born 1962), Welsh climber
 USS Crag (AM-214), a 1943 US Navy Admirable-class minesweeper
 The Crag, the final event in the Nickelodeon Guts action sports program
 Club de Radioaficionados de Guatemala, an amateur radio organization in Guatemala
 Constitutional Reform and Governance Act 2010, concerning United Kingdom constitutional law

See also
 
 Cragg (disambiguation)